Thomas P. Hannegan (May 6, 1970 – October 20, 2021) was an American businessman and politician from the state of Missouri. A Republican, Hannegan was elected to the Missouri House of Representatives from Missouri's 65th District in November 2016, and re-elected in 2018. He represented a portion of Saint Charles County north and northeast of the city of St. Charles to the Mississippi River. Hannegan also worked for a family-owned real estate business and as a magazine publisher and chief editor.

Hannegan was openly gay. In 2021, he was one of three LGBT Republicans serving in the Missouri House of Representatives, alongside representatives Phil Christofanelli and Chris Sander. His partner was Scott Mell, an account manager for Hannegan's magazine business.

Hannegan died from a stroke on October 20, 2021, at age 51.

Election results

References

1970 births
2021 deaths
Lindenwood University alumni
Republican Party members of the Missouri House of Representatives
People from St. Charles, Missouri
Politicians from St. Louis
21st-century American politicians
Date of birth missing
Place of death missing
LGBT state legislators in Missouri
Gay politicians